Ditchingham was a railway station in Ditchingham, Norfolk on the Waveney Valley Line. Opened on 2 March 1863, it closed to passengers along with the rest of the line in 1953.

References

External links
 Ditchingham station on navigable 1946 O. S. map

Disused railway stations in Norfolk
Former Great Eastern Railway stations
Railway stations in Great Britain opened in 1863
Railway stations in Great Britain closed in 1953